Gradungulidae, also known as large-clawed spiders, is a spider family endemic to Australia and New Zealand. They are medium to large-sized haplogyne spiders with three claws and two pairs of book-lungs similar to Mygalomorphae. Some species build extensive webs with an upper retreat tangle and connecting threads to scaffolding. This supports the ladder-like catching platform that is glued to the ground. Progradungula, a large spider with long legs like Hickmania, and Macrogradungula are the only cribellate genera of the family.

Species
Gradungula Forster, 1955
 Gradungula sorenseni Forster, 1955 — New Zealand

Kaiya Gray, 1987
 Kaiya bemboka Gray, 1987 — New South Wales
 Kaiya brindabella (Moran, 1985) — Australian Capital Territory
 Kaiya parnabyi Gray, 1987 — Victoria
 Kaiya terama Gray, 1987 (type species) — New South Wales

Macrogradungula Gray, 1987
 Macrogradungula moonya Gray, 1987 — Queensland

Pianoa Forster, 1987
 Pianoa isolata Forster, 1987 — New Zealand

Progradungula Forster & Gray, 1979
 Progradungula carraiensis Forster & Gray, 1979 (type species) — New South Wales
 Progradungula otwayensis Milledge, 1997 — Victoria

Spelungula Forster, 1987
 Spelungula cavernicola Forster, 1987 — New Zealand

Tarlina Gray, 1987
 Tarlina daviesae Gray, 1987 — Queensland
 Tarlina milledgei Gray, 1987 — New South Wales
 Tarlina noorundi Gray, 1987 (type species) — New South Wales
 Tarlina simipes Gray, 1987 — Queensland
 Tarlina smithersi Gray, 1987 — New South Wales
 Tarlina woodwardi (Forster, 1955) — Queensland

References

 Forster, R. R., Platnick, N. I. and Gray, M. R. (1987): A review of the spider superfamilies Hypochiloidea and Austrochiloidea (Araneae, Araneomorphae). Bulletin of the AMNH 185(1): 1-116 Abstract - PDF (50Mb)

External links

 Carrai cave spider Progradungula carraiensis

 
Spiders of Australia
Spiders of New Zealand
Araneomorphae families
Taxa named by Raymond Robert Forster